Rebeca Margoth Espinosa Justavino (born 5 July 1992) is a Panamanian footballer who plays as a defender for the Panama women's national team.

International career
Espinosa appeared in one match for Panama at the 2018 CONCACAF Women's Championship.

See also
 List of Panama women's international footballers

References

1992 births
Living people
Panamanian women's footballers
Women's association football defenders
Club Sol de América footballers
Panama women's international footballers
Footballers at the 2019 Pan American Games
Pan American Games competitors for Panama
Panamanian expatriate women's footballers
Panamanian expatriate sportspeople in Paraguay
Expatriate women's footballers in Paraguay